The Osijek tram system is operated by the City Transport of Osijek (GPP Osijek) and serves the city of Osijek, capital of the Slavonia region of Croatia.

The Osijek network is the only Croatian tram system still in existence outside Zagreb. Services have operated continuously since the first horse-car tram line was opened in 1884 (connecting the railway station and city square), and the first electric tram ran in 1926.

The present network consists of two lines which intersect in the city square (Trg Ante Starčevića) and the fleet consists of refurbished Tatra T3 PVO vehicles and some newly acquired second hand Duewag GT6. During the Croatian War of Independence, five Tatra T3 streetcars were destroyed and two female drivers were killed in 1991/92.  

There is also an old Škoda tourist heritage tram, which can be rented for special occasions. The tram dates back to the start of electrical operation, back in 1926.

All tracks are at 1000 mm (metre gauge) width. There are three terminal loops, and two loops used rarely only when shorter route service is provided. There is also an inner city loop for the part of line 2, which connects the main railway station with the city centre. Unlike line 1, which is double track in its whole length, line 2 is composed of a loop segment, a double track segment and the remainder being single track with passing loops. At the main vehicle depot (Remiza) there is a track triangle structure used regularly for turning tramway vehicles when starting and/or ending service.

In November 2014, Line 1 was extended from Višnjevac Sjever to Višnjevac Okretište.

A 2018 reorganization of public transport which abolished the tariff union between GPP and the private transport operators reintroduced the city centre circulator, connecting the main square and the city's railway station. Popularly known as the "Kolodvorac" (lit. Station-runner), the line previously existed until 2008, when it was abolished. However, this line was removed again on 15th April 2019 due to a low amount of passengers and a bad time organisation with Line 2.

Current lines
 Line 1: Višnjevac - Trg Ante Starčevića - Zeleno polje

 Line 2: Trg Ante Starčevića - Bikara - Kolodvor - Trg Ante Starčevića

See also
 Trams in Zagreb

References

External links
 Osijek at UrbanRail.net

Osijek
Osijek
Metre gauge railways in Croatia
600 V DC railway electrification
Osijek